"No Money Down" is a song written and recorded by American rock musician Lou Reed, released as both a 7" and 12" single from his fourteenth solo studio album, Mistrial (1986). The only single to chart from the album, it peaked at No. 75 on the Australian ARIA singles chart.

Reed performed the song live four times during the Amnesty International's A Conspiracy of Hope short tour, including a filmed performance of the song at Giants Stadium, in East Rutherford, New Jersey, with altered lyrics.

Music video
The official music video, directed by rock duo Godley & Creme formerly of 10cc, features a simple animatronic version of Reed miming along to the song. During the final verse, gloved human hands tear away its wig, sunglasses, and rubber skin to expose the skeleton beneath, then pull off underlying components of the face. The music video was later featured on an episode of adult animated series Beavis and Butt-Head.

Track listing
 EP 12"
"No Money Down" (Extended Version) – 5:40
"No Money Down" (Dub Version) – 5:22
"Don't Hurt a Woman" – 4:01

Chart performance

References

External links
 Official music video on Google Video
 

Lou Reed songs
1986 singles
Music videos directed by Godley and Creme